William Wright (November 13, 1794November 1, 1866) was an American politician who served as 5th Mayor of Newark, New Jersey, represented  as a Whig in the United States House of Representatives from 1843 to 1847, and represented New Jersey in the United States Senate as a Democrat from 1853 to 1859, and again from 1863 until his death.

Biography
He was born in Clarkstown, Rockland County, New York; attended the public schools and Poughkeepsie Academy; was a volunteer for the defense of Stonington, Connecticut, in the War of 1812; learned the saddler's trade and engaged in business in Bridgeport, Connecticut; moved to Newark, New Jersey in 1821 and ran a saddlery and leather business there. He served as mayor of Newark from 1840 to 1843.

On May 25, 1843, Wright was chosen as the second president of the Morris and Essex Railroad to succeed Lewis Condict, a post he held until his death more than twenty years later.

In October 1843, Wright was elected as an Independent Whig to the 28th United States Congress in the new 5th Congressional District (Bergen, Essex, Hudson, and Passaic Counties), and was reelected as a Whig without opposition in 1844 to the 29th United States Congress (March 4, 1845 – March 3, 1847).

He was an unsuccessful candidate for Governor of New Jersey in 1847, and affiliated with the Democratic Party in 1850. Wright was elected as a Democrat to the United States Senate and served from March 4, 1853 to March 3, 1859, but was an unsuccessful candidate for reelection in 1858. He was the chairman, Committee on Manufactures (33rd United States Congress and 34th United States Congress), Committee to Audit and Control the Contingent Expenses (35th United States Congress), Committee on Engrossed Bills (35th Congress); again elected as a Democrat to the United States Senate and served from March 4, 1863 until his death in Newark. He was interred in Mount Pleasant Cemetery in Newark.

Family
In 1819, Wright married Minerva Darrow. They were the parents of three children, Frederick, Catherine, and Edward.

Their son Colonel Edward H. Wright (1824–1913) was a career officer in the United States Army. Edward Wright was the husband of Dorothea "Dora" Eliza Mason (October 29, 1840 – October 4, 1916). Known as Dora, she was the daughter of Governor Stevens T. Mason. Edward and Dora Wright were the parents of William M. Wright, a U.S. Army officer who attained the rank of lieutenant general.

See also
List of United States Congress members who died in office (1790–1899)

References

External links

William Wright at The Political Graveyard

1794 births
1866 deaths
People from Rockland County, New York
Mayors of Newark, New Jersey
New Jersey Democrats
Burials at Mount Pleasant Cemetery (Newark, New Jersey)
Democratic Party United States senators from New Jersey
Independent members of the United States House of Representatives
Whig Party members of the United States House of Representatives from New Jersey
19th-century American politicians